The 2001 Casino Magic 500 was the 5th round of the 2001 Indy Racing League season. It took place on June 9, 2001 at Texas Motor Speedway.

Qualifying
Mark Dismore, for the 4th time in his Indy Racing League career, qualified on pole with a speed of 215.508 mph. His teammate Scott Sharp started alongside him on the first row.

Race

Lap 1 - Lap 78
At the end of lap 1, Mark Dismore was the leader, Eddie Cheever Jr. was in second and Sam Hornish Jr. was in third. After 3 laps, Cheever Jr. took the lead from Dismore. The top 12 after 10 laps was the following: Eddie Cheever Jr., Sam Hornish Jr., Scott Sharp, Mark Dismore, Shigeaki Hattori, Robbie Buhl, Billy Boat, Donnie Beechler, Buddy Lazier, Airton Daré, Greg Ray and Jeff Ward. Caution waved for the first time on lap 25, when debris landed on the back stretch. The leaders used this as an opportunity to pit, though some elected to stay out, which promoted Jaques Lazier to the lead. The restart came at lap 32. On lap 72, a major crash, involving Sarah Fisher, Davey Hamilton and Jeret Schroeder, occurred. Schroeder suffered an engine failure, which sent him into a spin and into the path of Hamilton. Hamilton made heavy contact with the wall and almost flipped in the incident. Fisher suffered suspension damage when a tire impacted her car as she drove by the scene of the incident. Hamilton suffered severe injuries to his feet and lower legs, which caused doctors to seriously consider amputation in order for his survival. While amputation was unnecessary, Hamilton would undergo 23 surgeries and spend a year in a wheelchair in the aftermath of the accident. It would be his last race until 2007. The incident brought out the race's second caution, which allowed for another opportunity for pitstops. After the stops, the top 10 after 78 laps was: Greg Ray, Eddie Cheever Jr., Felipe Giaffone, Scott Sharp, Sam Hornish Jr., Jeff Ward, Airton Daré, Billy Boat, Didier Andre and Eliseo Salazar.

Lap 89 - Lap 116
The restart came at lap 89. Some laps later, Airton Daré suffered an engine problem, bring out the race's third caution. Daré would spend considerable amount of time behind the wall, but would rejoin the race some 55 laps behind the leader. Racing resumed on lap 116.

Closing Stages: Last 44 laps
With 44 laps to go, caution once again came out for debris. The restart came with 40 laps to go, with Scott Sharp leading the field. With 27 laps to go, Eddie Cheever tried a three-wide pass with Greg Ray and Sharp, but ran out of room and was forced to back out, allowing  Jeff Ward to take third. Bearing issues brought an end to Ward's run, though, and brought out another caution. The restart came with 12 laps to go with Scott Sharp still leading the field. With 11 laps to go, Cheever, Sharp and Ray battled for the lead, with Ray emerging the leader. However,  with 5 laps to go, the leaders came up on Robby McGehee on the back stretch. Ray attempted to dive to the inside of McGehee to lap him, but made contact, causing both cars to spin and sending McGehee into the path of Cheever. All three cars retired and Sharp inherited the lead. With the track unable to be cleared for a green flag finish, Scott Sharp took victory under caution conditions.

Final results

Notes:
 Race finished under caution

Point standings after 5 races
 Sam Hornish Jr. 187 points
 Eliseo Salazar -30
 Scott Sharp -40
 Felipe Giaffone (R) -47
 Buddy Lazier -70
 Billy Boat -74
 Buzz Calkins -83
 Greg Ray -84
 Jeff Ward -85
 Robby McGehee -101

 (R) denotes a contender for the Rookie of the Year award

References

Casino Magic 500
Casino
Firestone 600